Jiangxi is a town of Jiangnan District, Nanning, Guangxi, China. , it administers Jiangxi Residential Community and the following ten villages:
Jinjiang Village
Tongxin Village
Tonghua Village
Tongning Village
Tongliang Village
Anping Village
Zhixin Village
Yangmei Village
Nalang Village
Tongjiang Village

References

Towns of Guangxi
Nanning